Iron Maze is a 1991 Japanese and American film directed by Hiroaki Yoshida and executive produced by Oliver Stone, starring Jeff Fahey, Bridget Fonda, Hiroaki Murakami, and J.T. Walsh.

Based on Ryūnosuke Akutagawa's story In a Grove (the same short story that was used for Kurosawa's Rashomon), this contemporary re-telling shifts the action to a Pennsylvania 'Rust Belt' town.

Plot 
The son of a Japanese billionaire is injured in an abandoned steel mill he bought in a Pennsylvania town. The police discover it might not be an accident when they start questioning the people in the town.

Cast 
 Jeff Fahey as Barry Mikowski
 Bridget Fonda as Chris Sugita
 Hiroaki Murakami as Junichi Sugita
 J.T. Walsh as Jack Ruhle
 Gabriel Damon as Mikey

Reception
Kevin Thomas of the Los Angeles Times called it "Rashomon in the Rust Belt". Vincent Canby of The New York Times said it was a "leading entry in the looniest movie of the year sweepstakes."

References

External links

1991 films
1991 thriller films
American thriller films
English-language Japanese films
Japanese thriller films
1990s English-language films
1990s American films
1990s Japanese films